The 1947 All-American Girls Professional Baseball League season marked the fifth season of the circuit. The teams Fort Wayne Daisies, Grand Rapids Chicks, Kenosha Comets, Muskegon Lassies, Peoria Redwings, Racine Belles, Rockford Peaches and South Bend Blue Sox competed through a 112-game schedule. The final Shaugnessy playoffs faced second place Grand Rapids against third place Racine in a Best of Seven Series.

By April 1947, all of the league's players were flown to Havana, Cuba for spring training. At the time, the Brooklyn Dodgers trained in the Cuban capital because Jackie Robinson, who would be the first Afro-American to play in the Major Leagues, was training with the Dodgers for the first time. By then, city ordinances in Vero Beach, Florida, where the Dodgers normally trained, prevented blacks and whites players from competing on the same field against each other. Notably, newspaper stories from Havana indicate that the All-American girls drew larger crowds for their exhibition games at Estadio Latinoamericano than did the Dodgers.

In addition to the eight team practices, nearly 55,000 Cuban fans attended a round-robin tournament which took place at Estadio Latinoamericano at the end of the training. The Racine Belles won the tournament and received a commemorative trophy from Esther Williams, American competitive swimmer and MGM movie star.

All in all, the rules, strategy and general play were the same in 1947. The sidearm pitching was strictly used, as the league was moving toward full overhand delivery for the next season. The sidearm throwing allowed the hitters more of an advantage than previous seasons. Rockford's Dorothy Kamenshek repeated her batting crown with a .306 batting average in a close race with Audrey Wagner (.305) of Kenosha. Nevertheless, five no-hitters were recorded during the regular season by Racine's Doris Barr, Muskegon Erma Bergmann,  Kenosha's Jean Cione, and Rockford's Margaret Holgerson and Betty Luna. The pitching highlight came from Muskegon's Doris Sams, who hurled the third perfect game in league history. In addition, P/OF Sams posted an 11–4 record and a 0.98 earned run average in 19 pitching appearances, while batting a combined average of .280 (97-for-346) in 107 total games. Following the season, Sams was honored with the AAGPBL Player of the Year Award.

At the end, Grand Rapids, Muskegon and Racine battled for the regular season title, until Muskegon got the victory with just two days remaining the schedule. Muskegon lost to Racine in the first round, three games to one, behind a strong pitching effort from Anna Mae Hutchison, who was credited with all three victories for Racine. By the other side, Grand Rapids defeated South Bend in five games guided by Connie Wisniewski, who pitched a win, stole home plate for another win, and collected an average of .318 (7-for-22).

The second round was a tight fight, when the first three contests all went to extra innings and Grand Rapids held a 3–1 advantage in the best of seven series. But the defending champion Racine won the next two games to force a decisive game seven. In a pitching duel, Mildred Earp defeated Hutchison and the Belles on a 1–0, five hit shutout, while driving in the winning run to give Grand Rapids the championship.

In 1947 average crowds at AAGPBL games were two to three thousand people, while attendance records were set in Muskegon, Peoria and Racine ballparks  .

Final standings

Postseason

Batting statistics

Pitching statistics

All-Star Game

See also
1947 Major League Baseball season

Sources

External links
AAGPBL Official Website
AAGPBL Records
Baseball Historian files
The Diamond Angle profiles and interviews
SABR Projects – Jim Sargent articles
YouTube videos

All-American Girls Professional Baseball League seasons
1940s in women's baseball
1947 in baseball
All